The Conseil Régional de l'Environnement de Montréal is a not-for-profit environmental organization in Montreal, Quebec, Canada.

The council's website indicates that it was founded in 1996. It is an umbrella group for several different organizations; in 1999, there were thirty-five member groups. Former Quebec cabinet minister Robert Perreault was the council's director-general for several years. In 2005, he spoke against an extension of Quebec Autoroute 25.

Directors-General
Director Generals:
Robert Perreault (2001–07)
André Porlier (2007–10)
Coralie Deny (2010–)

References

Environmental organizations based in Quebec
Organizations based in Montreal